Yuliya Svitlychna (born 6 June 1984, Kharkiv) is a Ukrainian politician. In a 2019 Ukrainian parliamentary election by-election on 15 March 2020 Svitlychna was elected to Ukraine's parliament. From 15 October 2016 until 6 November 2019 she was the Governor of Kharkiv Oblast. Before this she was a Deputy of the Kharkiv Regional Council of 7th convocation, Vice President of the Chamber of Regions in the Congress of Local and Regional Authorities of the Council of Europe. Svitlychna has a PhD in state administration and was during her reign the youngest regional governor in Ukraine.

Biography

In 2005 Svitlychna graduated from State University of Food Technology and Trade as expert on international economics.

In 2005 -2006 she held senior positions at production companies.

In 2006 she started her career as civil servant at the Head Office of Economics, Kharkiv Oblast State Administration (RSA), after which she returned to working in private sector of economics.

In 2009–2012 Svitlychna graduated with honors from Kharkiv Regional Institute of Public Administration of the National Academy of Public Administration attached to the Office of the President of Ukraine where she studied state administration, and finished post-graduate studies on mechanisms of state administration.

In 2014 she returned to civil service as Head of the Department of Competitive Improvement of the Region at Kharkiv RSA, then, since 2014 – Deputy Head of Kharkiv RSA, First Deputy Head, Acting Head. During her years as Deputy Head Svitlychna oversaw international relations, namely increasing the region's fame and attracting investment. She is also famous for lobbying Kharkiv Region's interests in the United States and China. 

In the 2015 Ukrainian local elections she was elected Deputy of Kharkiv Oblast Council for Petro Poroshenko Bloc. As Deputy, she is a member of Ukrainian delegation to the Congress of Local and Regional Authorities of the Council of Europe for 2016–2020. At the 31st session of the Congress Svitlychna was elected Vice President of the Chamber of Regions, and is also a member of the Congress Bureau responsible for coordinating the work of chambers and committees as well as organizing sessions. On 30 August 2016 Svitlychna became acting Governor of Kharkiv Oblast after her predecessor Ihor Rainin on 29 Aug 2016 had been promoted to head the  Presidential Administration of Ukraine. On 15 October 2016 she was officially appointed Governor of Kharkiv by President Petro Poroshenko.

On 6 November 2019 President Volodymyr Zelensky replaced Svitlychna and appointed Oleksiy Kucher Governor of Kharkiv Oblast.

In a 2019 Ukrainian parliamentary election by-election on 15 March 2020 Svitlychna won (as an independent candidate) the parliamentary seat that was vacated by Kucher. She won this electoral district 179 located in Kharkiv Oblast with 77.54% or 30.194 votes (voter turnout was 27.47%, Kucher had been elected with a 51.01% voter turnout). (Early in the campaign) Kucher's party Servant of the People had withdrawn its candidate in support of Svitlychna.

In the October 2020 Kharkiv local election a new local party backed by Svitlychna, Bloc Svitlychna — Together! participated. It won 17 seats in the Kharkiv Oblast Council. and 6 deputies in the Kharkiv City Council.

See also 
 Kharkiv Oblast Council
 Denys Skoryi

References

External links

KHARKIV REGION OFFICE OPENED IN U.S.
Remarks by Ambassador Marie Yovanovitch at the Kharkiv Investment Forum
Opening of Chinese-Ukrainian House in Harbin and Kharkiv region Representative Office in Heilongjiang province
Ukrainian delegation took part in the 27th Harbin International Economic and Trade Fair

1984 births
Living people
Politicians from Kharkiv
National Academy of State Administration alumni
Governors of Kharkiv Oblast
Petro Poroshenko Bloc politicians
Independent politicians in Ukraine
Ninth convocation members of the Verkhovna Rada
21st-century Ukrainian politicians
21st-century Ukrainian women politicians
Women members of the Verkhovna Rada